The 1878–79 United States House of Representatives elections were held on various dates in various states between June 3, 1878 and September 3, 1879. Each state set its own date for its elections to the House of Representatives before or after the first session of the 46th United States Congress convened on March 18, 1879. Elections were held for all 293 seats, representing 38 states. This was the last election cycle that at least one state held its regular congressional election in an odd-numbered year.

These elections occurred in the middle of President Rutherford B. Hayes's term. With a sour economy as the nation's pressing issue, both major parties lost seats to the new Greenback Party, which was established to promote the long-term use of paper money as a solution to stop enormous economic fluctuations. The Democratic Party remained the largest party, but lost its majority. However, it allied with several independent politicians and was able to remain in power. This was the fourth and last recorded House election where both major parties lost seats at the same time.

Election summaries

Election dates 

In most states, the elections were held November 5, 1878.

In 1845, Congress set a uniform nationwide date for choosing presidential electors. This Act of Congress did not affect election dates for Congress, which remained within the jurisdiction of state governments, but over time, the states moved their congressional elections to this date as well. In this cycle, there were still 7 states with earlier election dates, and 1 with a later election date:

 Early elections
 June 3, 1878: Oregon
 September 3, 1878: Vermont
 September 9, 1878: Maine
 October 7, 1878: Indiana
 October 8, 1878: Iowa, Ohio, West Virginia
 Standard election date
 November 5, 1878
 Late election
 September 3, 1879: California

California's elections were the last time a state held congressional general elections after November.

Special elections 
 
Elections are listed by date and district.

|-
! 
| John E. Leonard
|  | Republican
| 1876
|  | Incumbent died March 15, 1878.New member elected elected November 5, 1878.Democratic hold.
| nowrap | 

|-
! 
| Frank Welch
|  | Republican
| 1876
|  | Incumbent died September 4, 1878.New member elected elected November 5, 1878.Republican hold.
| nowrap | 

|-
! 
| Terence J. Quinn
|  | Democratic
| 1876
|  | Incumbent died June 18, 1878.New member elected November 5, 1878.Republican gain.Successor also elected the same day to the next term, see below.
| nowrap | 

|-
! 
| Beverly B. Douglas
|  | Democratic
| 1874
|  | Incumbent died December 22, 1878.New member elected elected January 23, 1879.Democratic hold.
| nowrap | 

|-
! 
| Julian Hartridge
|  | Democratic
| 1874
|  | Incumbent died January 8, 1879.New member elected elected February 10, 1879.Democratic hold.Successor seated February 10, 1879.
| nowrap | 

|-
! 
| Gustav Schleicher
|  | Democratic
| 1874
|  | Incumbent died January 10, 1879.New member elected April 15, 1879.Democratic hold.Successor seated April 15, 1879.
| nowrap | 

|-
! 
| Rush Clark
|  | Republican
| 1876
|  | Incumbent died April 29, 1879.New member elected elected October 14, 1879.Republican hold.
| nowrap | 

|-
! 
| Alexander Smith
|  | Republican
| 1878
|  | Member-elect died November 5, 1878.New member elected November 4, 1879.Democratic gain.
| nowrap | 

|}

Alabama 

|-
! 
| James T. Jones
|  | Democratic
| 1876
|  | Incumbent lost renomination.New member elected.Democratic hold.
| nowrap | 

|-
! 
| Hilary A. Herbert
|  | Democratic
| 1876
| Incumbent re-elected.
| nowrap | 

|-
! 
| Jeremiah N. Williams
|  | Democratic
| 1874
|  | Incumbent retired.New member elected.Democratic hold.
| nowrap | 

|-
! 
| Charles M. Shelley
|  | Democratic
| 1876
| Incumbent re-elected.
| nowrap | 

|-
! 
| Robert F. Ligon
|  | Democratic
| 1876
|  | Incumbent retired.New member elected.Democratic hold.
| nowrap | 

|-
! 
| Goldsmith W. Hewitt
|  | Democratic
| 1874
|  | Incumbent retired.New member elected.Democratic hold.
| nowrap | 

|-
! 
| William H. Forney
|  | Democratic
| 1874
| Incumbent re-elected.
| nowrap | 

|-
! 
| William W. Garth
|  | Democratic
| 1874
|  | Incumbent lost re-election.New member elected.Greenback gain.
| nowrap | 

|}

Arkansas 

|-
! 
| Lucien C. Gause
|  | Democratic
| 1874
|  | Incumbent retired.New member elected.Democratic hold.
| nowrap | 

|-
! 
| William F. Slemons
|  | Democratic
| 1874
| Incumbent re-elected.
| nowrap | 

|-
! 
| Jordan E. Cravens
|  | Independent Democratic
| 1876
|  | Incumbent re-elected.as a DemocratDemocratic gain.
| nowrap | 

|-
! 
| Thomas M. Gunter
|  | Democratic
| 1874
| Incumbent re-elected.
| nowrap | 

|}

California 

|-
! 
| Horace Davis
|  | Republican
| 1876
| Incumbent re-elected.
| nowrap | 

|-
! 
| Horace F. Page
|  | Republican
| 1872
| Incumbent re-elected.
| nowrap | 

|-
! 
| John K. Luttrell
|  | Democratic
| 1872
|  | Incumbent retired.New member elected.Democratic hold.
| nowrap | 

|-
! 
| Romualdo Pacheco
|  | Republican
| 1876
| Incumbent re-elected.
| nowrap | 

|}

Colorado 

|-
! 
| colspan=3 | None
|  | New state.New member elected.Republican gain.
| nowrap | 

|}

Patterson successfully contested the election and was seated March 4, 1877.

Connecticut 

|-
! 
| George M. Landers
|  | Democratic
| 1875
|  | Incumbent lost re-election.New member elected.Republican gain.
| nowrap | 

|-
! 
| James Phelps
|  | Democratic
| 1875
| Incumbent re-elected.
| nowrap | 

|-
! 
| John T. Wait
|  | Republican
| 1876
| Incumbent re-elected.
| nowrap | 

|-
! 
| Levi Warner
|  | Democratic
| 1876
|  | Incumbent retired.New member elected.Republican gain.
| nowrap | 

|}

Delaware 

|-
! 
| James Williams
|  | Democratic
| 1874
|  | Incumbent retired.New member elected.Democratic hold.
| nowrap | 

|}

Florida 

|-
! 
| Robert H. M. Davidson
|  | Democratic
| 1876
| Incumbent re-elected.
| nowrap | 

|-
! 
| Horatio Bisbee Jr.
|  | Republican
| 1876
|  | Incumbent lost re-election.New member elected.Democratic gain.
| nowrap | 

|}

In the  the difference between the two candidates, in the initial returns, was just 22 votes. Bisbee challenged Hull's election, and Bisbee challenged Hull's electionwas eventually awarded the seat on January 22, 1881.

Georgia 

|-
! 
| Julian Hartridge
|  | Democratic
| 1874
|  | Incumbent retired.New member elected.Democratic hold.
| nowrap | 

|-
! 
| William E. Smith
|  | Democratic
| 1874
| Incumbent re-elected.
| nowrap | 

|-
! 
| Philip Cook
|  | Democratic
| 1872
| Incumbent re-elected.
| nowrap | 

|-
! 
| Henry R. Harris
|  | Democratic
| 1872
|  | Incumbent lost re-election.New member elected.Independent Democratic gain.
| nowrap | 

|-
! 
| Milton A. Candler
|  | Democratic
| 1876
|  | Incumbent retired.New member elected.Democratic hold.
| nowrap | 

|-
! 
| James H. Blount
|  | Democratic
| 1872
| Incumbent re-elected.
| nowrap | 

|-
! 
| William H. Felton
|  | Independent Democratic
| 1874
| Incumbent re-elected.
| nowrap | 

|-
! 
| Alexander H. Stephens
|  | Democratic
| 1872
| Incumbent re-elected.
| nowrap | 

|-
! 
| Hiram P. Bell
|  | Democratic
| 1876
|  | Lost re-nominationIndependent Democratic gain.
| nowrap | 

|}

Illinois 

|-
! 
| William Aldrich
|  | Republican
| 1876
| Incumbent re-elected.
| nowrap | 

|-
! 
| Carter Harrison Sr.
|  | Democratic
| 1874
|  | Incumbent retiredto run for Mayor.New member elected.Republican gain.
| nowrap | 

|-
! 
| Lorenzo Brentano
|  | Republican
| 1876
|  | Lost re-nominationRepublican hold.
| nowrap | 

|-
! 
| William Lathrop
|  | Republican
| 1876
|  | Incumbent retired.New member elected.Republican hold.
| nowrap | 

|-
! 
| Horatio C. Burchard
|  | Republican
| 1869 
|  | Lost re-nominationRepublican hold.
| nowrap | 

|-
! 
| Thomas J. Henderson
|  | Republican
| 1874
| Incumbent re-elected.
| nowrap | 

|-
! 
| Philip C. Hayes
|  | Republican
| 1876
| Incumbent re-elected.
| nowrap | 

|-
! 
| Greenbury L. Fort
|  | Republican
| 1872
| Incumbent re-elected.
| nowrap | 

|-
! 
| Thomas A. Boyd
|  | Republican
| 1876
| Incumbent re-elected.
| nowrap | 

|-
! 
| Benjamin F. Marsh
|  | Republican
| 1876
| Incumbent re-elected.
| nowrap | 

|-
! 
| Robert M. Knapp
|  | Democratic
| 1876
|  | Lost re-nominationDemocratic hold.
| nowrap | 

|-
! 
| William M. Springer
|  | Democratic
| 1874
| Incumbent re-elected.
| nowrap | 

|-
! 
| Thomas F. Tipton
|  | Republican
| 1876
|  | Incumbent lost re-election.New member elected.Democratic gain.
| nowrap | 

|-
! 
| Joseph G. Cannon
|  | Republican
| 1872
| Incumbent re-elected.
| nowrap | 

|-
! 
| John R. Eden
|  | Democratic
| 1872
|  | Lost re-nominationGreenback gain.
| nowrap | 

|-
! 
| William A. J. Sparks
|  | Democratic
| 1874
| Incumbent re-elected.
| nowrap | 

|-
! 
| William R. Morrison
|  | Democratic
| 1862
| Incumbent re-elected.
| nowrap | 

|-
! 
| William Hartzell
|  | Democratic
| 1874
|  | Incumbent retired.New member elected.Republican gain.
| nowrap | 

|-
! 
| Richard W. Townshend
|  | Democratic
| 1876
| Incumbent re-elected.
| nowrap | 

|}

Indiana 

|-
! 
| Benoni S. Fuller
|  | Democratic
| 1874
|  | Incumbent retired.New member elected.Republican gain.
| nowrap | 

|-
! 
| Thomas R. Cobb
|  | Democratic
| 1876
| Incumbent re-elected.
| nowrap | 

|-
! 
| George A. Bicknell
|  | Democratic
| 1876
| Incumbent re-elected.
| nowrap | 

|-
! 
| Leonidas Sexton
|  | Republican
| 1876
|  | Incumbent lost re-election.New member elected.Democratic gain.
| nowrap | 

|-
! 
| Thomas M. Browne
|  | Republican
| 1876
| Incumbent re-elected.
| nowrap | 

|-
! 
| Milton S. Robinson
|  | Republican
| 1874
|  | Incumbent retired.New member elected.Democratic gain.
| nowrap | 

|-
! 
| John Hanna
|  | Republican
| 1876
|  | Incumbent lost re-election.New member elected.Greenback gain.
| nowrap | 

|-
! 
| Morton C. Hunter
|  | Republican
| 1872
|  | Incumbent lost re-election.New member elected.Democratic gain.
| nowrap | 

|-
! 
| Michael D. White
|  | Republican
| 1876
|  | Incumbent retired.New member elected.Republican hold.
| nowrap | 

|-
! 
| William H. Calkins
|  | Republican
| 1876
| Incumbent re-elected.
| nowrap | 

|-
! 
| James L. Evans
|  | Republican
| 1874
|  | Incumbent retired.New member elected.Republican hold.
| nowrap | 

|-
! 
| Andrew H. Hamilton
|  | Democratic
| 1874
|  | Incumbent retired.New member elected.Democratic hold.
| nowrap | 

|-
! 
| John Baker
|  | Republican
| 1874
| Incumbent re-elected.
| nowrap | 

|}

Iowa 

|-
! 
| Joseph C. Stone
|  | Republican
| 1876
|  | Lost re-nominationRepublican hold.
| nowrap | 

|-
! 
| Hiram Price
|  | Republican
| 1876
| Incumbent re-elected.
| nowrap | 

|-
! 
| Theodore W. Burdick
|  | Republican
| 1876
|  | Incumbent retired.New member elected.Republican hold.
| nowrap | 

|-
! 
| Nathaniel C. Deering
|  | Republican
| 1876
| Incumbent re-elected.
| nowrap | 

|-
! 
| Rush Clark
|  | Republican
| 1876
| Incumbent re-elected.
| nowrap | 

|-
! 
| Ezekiel S. Sampson
|  | Republican
| 1874
|  | Incumbent lost re-election.New member elected.Greenback gain.
| nowrap | 

|-
! 
| Henry J. B. Cummings
|  | Republican
| 1876
|  | Incumbent lost re-election.New member elected.Greenback gain.
| nowrap | 

|-
! 
| William F. Sapp
|  | Republican
| 1876
| Incumbent re-elected.
| nowrap | 

|-
! 
| S. Addison Oliver
|  | Republican
| 1874
|  | Incumbent retired.New member elected.Republican hold.
| nowrap | 

|}

Kansas 

|-
! 
| William A. Phillips
|  | Republican
| 1872
|  | Lost re-nominationRepublican hold.
| nowrap | 

|-
! 
| Dudley C. Haskell
|  | Republican
| 1876
| Incumbent re-elected.
| nowrap | 

|-
! 
| Thomas Ryan
|  | Republican
| 1876
| Incumbent re-elected.
| nowrap | 

|}

Kentucky 

|-
! 
| Andrew Boone
|  | Democratic
| 1874
|  | Incumbent retired.New member elected.Independent Democratic gain.
| nowrap | 

|-
! 
| James A. McKenzie
|  | Democratic
| 1876
| Incumbent re-elected.
| nowrap | 

|-
! 
| John W. Caldwell
|  | Democratic
| 1876
| Incumbent re-elected.
| nowrap | 

|-
! 
| J. Proctor Knott
|  | Democratic
| 1874
| Incumbent re-elected.
| nowrap | 

|-
! 
| Albert S. Willis
|  | Democratic
| 1876
| Incumbent re-elected.
| nowrap | 

|-
! 
| John G. Carlisle
|  | Democratic
| 1876
| Incumbent re-elected.
| nowrap | 

|-
! 
| Joseph C. S. Blackburn
|  | Democratic
| 1874
| Incumbent re-elected.
| nowrap | 

|-
! 
| Milton J. Durham
|  | Democratic
| 1872
|  | Lost re-nominationDemocratic hold.
| nowrap | 

|-
! 
| Thomas Turner
|  | Democratic
| 1876
| Incumbent re-elected.
| nowrap | 

|-
! 
| John B. Clarke
|  | Democratic
| 1874
|  | Incumbent retired.New member elected.Democratic hold.
| nowrap | 

|}

Louisiana 

|-
! 
| Randall L. Gibson
|  | Democratic
| 1874
| Incumbent re-elected.
| nowrap | 

|-
! 
| E. John Ellis
|  | Democratic
| 1874
| Incumbent re-elected.
| nowrap | 

|-
! 
| Joseph H. Acklen
|  | Democratic
| 1876
| Incumbent re-elected.
| nowrap | 

|-
! 
| Joseph B. Elam
|  | Democratic
| 1876
| Incumbent re-elected.
| nowrap | 

|-
! 
| J. Smith Young
|  | Democratic
| 1878
|  | Incumbent retired.New member elected.Democratic hold.
| nowrap | 

|-
! 
| Edward W. Robertson
|  | Democratic
| 1876
| Incumbent re-elected.
| nowrap | 

|}

Maine 

|-
! 
| Thomas B. Reed
|  | Republican
| 1876
| Incumbent re-elected.
| nowrap | 

|-
! 
| William P. Frye
|  | Republican
| 1870
| Incumbent re-elected.
| nowrap | 

|-
! 
| Stephen Lindsey
|  | Republican
| 1876
| Incumbent re-elected.
| nowrap | 

|-
! 
| Llewellyn Powers
|  | Republican
| 1876
|  | Incumbent lost re-election.New member elected.Greenback gain.
| nowrap | 

|-
! 
| Eugene Hale
|  | Republican
| 1868
|  | Incumbent lost re-election.New member elected.Greenback gain.
| nowrap | 

|}

Maryland 

|-
! 
| Daniel M. Henry
|  | Democratic
| 1876
| Incumbent re-elected.
| nowrap | 

|-
! 
| Charles B. Roberts
|  | Democratic
| 1874
|  | Incumbent retired.New member elected.Democratic hold.
| nowrap | 

|-
! 
| William Kimmel
|  | Democratic
| 1876
| Incumbent re-elected.
| nowrap | 

|-
! 
| Thomas Swann
|  | Democratic
| 1868
|  | Incumbent retired.New member elected.Democratic hold.
| nowrap | 

|-
! 
| Eli J. Henkle
|  | Democratic
| 1874
| Incumbent re-elected.
| nowrap | 

|-
! 
| William Walsh
|  | Democratic
| 1874
|  | Incumbent retired.New member elected.Republican gain.
| nowrap | 

|}

Massachusetts 

|-
! 
| William W. Crapo
|  | Republican
| 1874
| Incumbent re-elected.
| nowrap | 

|-
! 
| Benjamin W. Harris
|  | Republican
| 1872
| Incumbent re-elected.
| nowrap | 

|-
! 
| Benjamin Dean
|  | Democratic
| 1876
|  | Incumbent lost re-election.New member elected.Republican gain.
| nowrap | 

|-
! 
| Leopold Morse
|  | Democratic
| 1876
| Incumbent re-elected.
| nowrap | 

|-
! 
| Nathaniel P. Banks
|  | Republican
| 1874
|  | Incumbent lost re-nomination.New member elected.Republican hold.
| nowrap | 

|-
! 
| George B. Loring
|  | Republican
| 1876
| Incumbent re-elected.
| nowrap | 

|-
! 
| Benjamin Butler
|  | Republican
| 1876
|  | Incumbent retired to run for Governor.New member elected.Republican hold.
| nowrap | 

|-
! 
| William Claflin
|  | Republican
| 1876
| Incumbent re-elected.
| nowrap | 

|-
! 
| William W. Rice
|  | Republican
| 1876
| Incumbent re-elected.
| nowrap | 

|-
! 
| Amasa Norcross
|  | Republican
| 1876
| Incumbent re-elected.
| nowrap | 

|-
! 
| George D. Robinson
|  | Republican
| 1876
| Incumbent re-elected.
| nowrap | 

|}

Michigan 

|-
! 
| Alpheus S. Williams
|  | Democratic
| 1874
|  | Incumbent lost re-election.New member elected.Republican gain.
| nowrap | 

|-
! 
| Edwin Willits
|  | Republican
| 1876
| Incumbent re-elected.
| nowrap | 

|-
! 
| Jonas H. McGowan
|  | Republican
| 1876
| Incumbent re-elected.
| nowrap | 

|-
! 
| Edwin W. Keightley
|  | Republican
| 1876
|  | Incumbent retired.New member elected.Republican hold.
| nowrap | 

|-
! 
| John W. Stone
|  | Republican
| 1876
| Incumbent re-elected.
| nowrap | 

|-
! 
| Mark S. Brewer
|  | Republican
| 1876
| Incumbent re-elected.
| nowrap | 

|-
! 
| Omar D. Conger
|  | Republican
| 1876
| Incumbent re-elected.
| nowrap | 

|-
! 
| Charles C. Ellsworth
|  | Republican
| 1876
|  | Incumbent retired.New member elected.Republican hold.
| nowrap | 

|-
! 
| Jay A. Hubbell
|  | Republican
| 1872
| Incumbent re-elected.
| nowrap | 

|}

Minnesota 

|-
! 
| Mark H. Dunnell
|  | Republican
| 1870
| Incumbent re-elected.
| nowrap | 

|-
! 
| Horace B. Strait
|  | Republican
| 1872
|  | Incumbent lost re-election.New member elected.Democratic gain.
| nowrap | 

|-
! 
| Jacob H. Stewart
|  | Republican
| 1876
|  | Incumbent retired.New member elected.Republican hold.
| nowrap | 

|}

Mississippi 

|-
! 
| Henry L. Muldrow
|  | Democratic
| 1876
| Incumbent re-elected.
| nowrap | 

|-
! 
| Van H. Manning
|  | Democratic
| 1876
| Incumbent re-elected.
| nowrap | 

|-
! 
| Hernando Money
|  | Democratic
| 1874
| Incumbent re-elected.
| nowrap | 

|-
! 
| Otho R. Singleton
|  | Democratic
| 1874
| Incumbent re-elected.
| nowrap | 

|-
! 
| Charles E. Hooker
|  | Democratic
| 1874
| Incumbent re-elected.
| nowrap | 

|-
! 
| James R. Chalmers
|  | Democratic
| 1876
| Incumbent re-elected.
| nowrap | 

|}

Missouri 

|-
! 
| Anthony F. Ittner
|  | Republican
| 1876
|  | Incumbent retired.New member elected.Democratic gain.
| nowrap | 

|-
! 
| Nathan Cole
|  | Republican
| 1876
|  | Incumbent lost re-election.New member elected.Democratic gain.
| nowrap | 

|-
! 
| Lyne Metcalfe
|  | Republican
| 1876
|  | Incumbent lost re-election.New member elected.Democratic gain.
| nowrap | 

|-
! 
| Robert A. Hatcher
|  | Democratic
| 1872
|  | Incumbent retired.New member elected.Democratic hold.
| nowrap | 

|-
! 
| Richard P. Bland
|  | Democratic
| 1872
| Incumbent re-elected.
| nowrap | 

|-
! 
| Charles H. Morgan
|  | Democratic
| 1874
|  | Lost re-nominationDemocratic hold.
| nowrap | 

|-
! 
| Thomas T. Crittenden
|  | Democratic
| 1876
|  | Incumbent retired.New member elected.Democratic hold.
| nowrap | 

|-
! 
| Benjamin J. Franklin
|  | Democratic
| 1874
|  | Incumbent retired.New member elected.Independent Democratic gain.
| nowrap | 

|-
! 
| David Rea
|  | Democratic
| 1874
|  | Incumbent lost re-election.New member elected.Greenback gain.
| nowrap | 

|-
! 
| Henry M. Pollard
|  | Republican
| 1876
|  | Incumbent lost re-election.New member elected.Democratic gain.
| nowrap | 

|-
! 
| John B. Clark Jr.
|  | Democratic
| 1872
| Incumbent re-elected.
| nowrap | 

|-
! 
| John M. Glover
|  | Democratic
| 1872
|  | Lost re-nominationDemocratic hold.
| nowrap | 

|-
! 
| Aylett H. Buckner
|  | Democratic
| 1872
|  | Lost re-nominationDemocratic hold.
| nowrap | 

|}

Nebraska 

|-
! 
| colspan=3 | Vacant due to Welch's death
|  | Incumbent died September 4, 1878.New member elected.Republican hold.
| nowrap | 

|}

Nevada 

|-
! 
| Thomas Wren
|  | Republican
| 1876
|  | Incumbent retired.New member elected.Republican hold.
| nowrap | 

|}

New Hampshire 

|-
! 
| Frank Jones
|  | Democratic
| 1875
|  | Incumbent retired.New member elected.Republican gain.
| nowrap | 

|-
! 
| James F. Briggs
|  | Republican
| 1877
| Incumbent re-elected.
| nowrap | 

|-
! 
| Henry W. Blair
|  | Republican
| 1877
|  | Elected to the U.S. SenateRepublican hold.
| nowrap | 

|}

New Jersey 

|-
! 
| Clement H. Sinnickson
|  | Republican
| 1874
|  | Incumbent retired.New member elected.Republican hold.
| nowrap | 

|-
! 
| John H. Pugh
|  | Republican
| 1876
|  | Incumbent lost re-election.New member elected.Democratic gain.
| nowrap | 

|-
! 
| Miles Ross
|  | Democratic
| 1874
| Incumbent re-elected.
| nowrap | 

|-
! 
| Alvah A. Clark
|  | Democratic
| 1876
| Incumbent re-elected.
| nowrap | 

|-
! 
| Augustus W. Cutler
|  | Democratic
| 1874
|  | Incumbent retired.New member elected.Republican gain.
| nowrap | 

|-
! 
| Thomas B. Peddie
|  | Republican
| 1876
|  | Incumbent retired.New member elected.Republican hold.
| nowrap | 

|-
! 
| Augustus A. Hardenbergh
|  | Democratic
| 1874
|  | Incumbent retired.New member elected.Republican gain.
| nowrap | 

|}

New York 

|-
! 
| James W. Covert
|  | Democratic
| 1876
| Incumbent re-elected.
| nowrap | 

|-
! 
| William D. Veeder
|  | Democratic
| 1876
|  | Incumbent retired.New member elected.Independent Democratic gain.
| nowrap | 

|-
! 
| Simeon B. Chittenden
|  | Republican
| 1874 
| Incumbent re-elected.
| nowrap | 

|-
! 
| Archibald M. Bliss
|  | Democratic
| 1874
| Incumbent re-elected.
| nowrap | 

|-
! 
| Nicholas Muller
|  | Democratic
| 1874
| Incumbent re-elected.
| nowrap | 

|-
! 
| Samuel S. Cox
|  | Democratic
| 1873 
| Incumbent re-elected.
| nowrap | 

|-
! 
| Anthony Eickhoff
|  | Democratic
| 1876
|  | Incumbent lost re-election.New member elected.Republican gain.
| nowrap | 

|-
! 
| Anson G. McCook
|  | Republican
| 1876
| Incumbent re-elected.
| nowrap | 

|-
! 
| Fernando Wood
|  | Democratic
| 1866
| Incumbent re-elected.
| nowrap | 

|-
! 
| Abram Hewitt
|  | Democratic
| 1874
|  | Incumbent retired.New member elected.Independent Democratic gain.
| nowrap | 

|-
! 
| Benjamin A. Willis
|  | Democratic
| 1874
|  | Incumbent lost re-election.New member elected.Republican gain.
| nowrap | 

|-
! 
| Clarkson Nott Potter
|  | Democratic
| 1876
|  | Incumbent retired.New member elected.Republican gain.
| nowrap | 

|-
! 
| John H. Ketcham
|  | Republican
| 1876
| Incumbent re-elected.
| nowrap | 

|-
! 
| George M. Beebe
|  | Democratic
| 1874
|  | Incumbent lost re-election.New member elected.Republican gain.
| nowrap | 

|-
! 
| Stephen L. Mayham
|  | Democratic
| 1876
|  | Incumbent retired.New member elected.Democratic hold.
| nowrap | 

|-
! 
| Terence J. Quinn
|  | Democratic
| 1876
|  | Incumbent Terence J. Quinn died June 18, 1878.New member elected.Republican gain.Successor also elected the same day to finish the term.
| nowrap | 

|-
! 
| Martin I. Townsend
|  | Republican
| 1874
|  | Incumbent retired.New member elected.Republican hold.
| nowrap | 

|-
! 
| Andrew Williams
|  | Republican
| 1874
|  | Incumbent retired.New member elected.Republican hold.
| nowrap | 

|-
! 
| Amaziah B. James
|  | Republican
| 1876
| Incumbent re-elected.
| nowrap | 

|-
! 
| John H. Starin
|  | Republican
| 1876
| Incumbent re-elected.
| nowrap | 

|-
! 
| Solomon Bundy
|  | Republican
| 1876
|  | Incumbent retired.New member elected.Republican hold.
| nowrap | 

|-
! 
| George A. Bagley
|  | Republican
| 1874
|  | Incumbent retired.New member elected.Republican hold.
| nowrap | 

|-
! 
| William J. Bacon
|  | Republican
| 1876
|  | Incumbent retired.New member elected.Republican hold.
| nowrap | 

|-
! 
| William H. Baker
|  | Republican
| 1874
|  | Incumbent retired.New member elected.Republican hold.
| nowrap | 

|-
! 
| Frank Hiscock
|  | Republican
| 1876
| Incumbent re-elected.
| nowrap | 

|-
! 
| John H. Camp
|  | Republican
| 1876
| Incumbent re-elected.
| nowrap | 

|-
! 
| Elbridge G. Lapham
|  | Republican
| 1874
| Incumbent re-elected.
| nowrap | 

|-
! 
| Jeremiah W. Dwight
|  | Republican
| 1876
| Incumbent re-elected.
| nowrap | 

|-
! 
| John N. Hungerford
|  | Republican
| 1876
|  | Incumbent retired.New member elected.Republican hold.
| nowrap | 

|-
! 
| Elizur K. Hart
|  | Democratic
| 1876
|  | Incumbent retired.New member elected.Republican gain.
| nowrap | 

|-
! 
| Charles B. Benedict
|  | Democratic
| 1876
|  | Incumbent retired.New member elected.Republican gain.
| nowrap | 

|-
! 
| Daniel N. Lockwood
|  | Democratic
| 1876
|  | Incumbent lost re-election.New member elected.Republican gain.
| nowrap | 

|-
! 
| George W. Patterson
|  | Republican
| 1876
|  | Incumbent retired.New member elected.Republican hold.
| nowrap | 

|}

Pennsylvania

South Carolina 

South Carolina was rampant with voter fraud, particularly through the use of tissue ballots, thin ballots hidden in the normal ballot, typically 10 to 20 at a time. The almost statewide exclusion of Republicans as Commissioners of Elections, and the ensuing appointment of nearly all Democratic Managers of Elections, allowed to Democratic Managers to perpetrate this scheme. When the votes were counted and more votes than voters were found, the Managers removed and destroyed the Republican ballots resulting in the complete takeover of the state.

|-
! 
| Joseph Rainey
|  | Republican
| 1870 (special)
|  | Incumbent lost re-election.New member elected.Democratic gain.
| nowrap | 

|-
! 
| Richard H. Cain
|  | Republican
| 1876
|  | Incumbent lost re-election.New member elected.Democratic gain.
| nowrap | 

|-
! 
| D. Wyatt Aiken
|  | Democratic
| 1876
| Incumbent re-elected.
| nowrap | 

|-
! 
| John H. Evins
|  | Democratic
| 1876
| Incumbent re-elected.
| nowrap | 

|-
! 
| Robert Smalls
|  | Republican
| 1874
|  | Incumbent lost re-election.New member elected.Democratic gain.
| nowrap | 

|}

Tennessee 

|-
! 
| James H. Randolph
|  | Republican
| 1876
|  |Incumbent retired.New member elected.Democratic gain.
| nowrap | 

|-
! 
| Jacob M. Thornburgh
|  | Republican
| 1872
|  |Incumbent retired.New member elected.Republican hold.
| nowrap | 

|-
! 
| George G. Dibrell
|  | Democratic
| 1874
| Incumbent re-elected.
| nowrap | 

|-
! 
| Haywood Y. Riddle
|  | Democratic
| 1875 (special)
|  |Incumbent retired.New member elected.Democratic hold.
|  nowrap | 

|-
! 
| John M. Bright
|  | Democratic
| 1870
| Incumbent re-elected.
| nowrap | 

|-
! 
| John F. House
|  | Democratic
| 1874
| Incumbent re-elected.
| nowrap | 

|-
! 
| Washington C. Whitthorne
|  | Democratic
| 1870
| Incumbent re-elected.
| nowrap | 

|-
! 
| John D. C. Atkins
|  | Democratic
| 1872
| Incumbent re-elected.
| nowrap | 

|-
! 
| William P. Caldwell
|  | Democratic
| 1874
|  |Incumbent retired.New member elected.Democratic hold.
| nowrap | 

|-
! 
| H. Casey Young
|  | Democratic
| 1874
| Incumbent re-elected.
| 

|}

Texas

Vermont

Virginia

West Virginia 

|-
! 
| Benjamin Wilson
|  | Democratic
| 1874
| Incumbent re-elected.
| nowrap | 

|-
! 
| Benjamin F. Martin
|  | Democratic
| 1876
| Incumbent re-elected.
| nowrap | 

|-
! 
| John E. Kenna
|  | Democratic
| 1876
| Incumbent re-elected.
| nowrap | 

|}

Wisconsin 

Wisconsin elected eight members of congress on Election Day, November 5, 1878.

|-
! 
| Charles G. Williams
|  | Republican
| 1872
| Incumbent re-elected.
| nowrap | 

|-
! 
| Lucien B. Caswell
|  | Republican
| 1874
| Incumbent re-elected.
| nowrap | 

|-
! 
| George C. Hazelton
|  | Republican
| 1876
| Incumbent re-elected.
| nowrap | 

|-
! 
| William Pitt Lynde
|  | Democratic
| 1874
|  | Incumbent lost renomination.New member elected.Democratic hold.
| nowrap | 

|-
! 
| Edward S. Bragg
|  | Democratic
| 1876
| Incumbent re-elected.
| nowrap | 

|-
! 
| Gabriel Bouck
|  | Democratic
| 1876
| Incumbent re-elected.
| nowrap | 

|-
! 
| Herman L. Humphrey
|  | Republican
| 1876
| Incumbent re-elected.
| nowrap | 

|-
! 
| Thaddeus C. Pound
|  | Republican
| 1876
| Incumbent re-elected.
| nowrap | 

|}

Non-voting delegates 

|-
! 

|-
! 
| Jefferson P. Kidder
|  | Republican
| 1874
|  | Incumbent lost re-election.New member elected.Independent Republican gain.
| nowrap | 

|-
! 
| Stephen S. Fenn
|  | Democratic
| 1874
|  | Incumbent retired.New member elected.Democratic hold.
| nowrap | 

|-
! 
| Martin Maginnis
|  | Democratic
| 1872
| Incumbent re-elected.
| nowrap | 

|-
! 

|-
! 

|-
! 

|-
! 
| William W. Corlett
|  | Republican
| 1876
|  | Incumbent retired.New member elected.Republican hold.
| nowrap | 

|}

See also 
 1878–79 United States Senate elections
 45th United States Congress
 46th United States Congress

Notes

References

Bibliography

External links 
 Office of the Historian (Office of Art & Archives, Office of the Clerk, U.S. House of Representatives)